Coelhoso is a civil parish in the municipality of Bragança, Portugal. The population in 2011 was 319, in an area of 19.78 km².

References

Parishes of Bragança, Portugal